Death in Spring is a novel by Catalan author Mercè Rodoreda. It was first published in Catalan as La mort i la primavera in 1986. It was released in English in 2009 by Open Letter Books, translated by Martha Tennent. It was rereleased by Penguin European Writers in 2018.

References

1986 novels
Catalan-language novels
Open Letter Books books